Bharatiya Shiksha Board (BSB) is a financially and administratively independent School Education board setup by the Government of India through its autonomous body Maharshi Sandipani Rastriya Veda Vidya Pratishthan (MSRVVP), Ujjain in the Department of Higher Education, Ministry of the then HRD (now Ministry of Education)

References 

Indian educational programs